Ulaanbaatar is divided into nine düüregs or municipal districts: Baganuur, Bagakhangai, Bayangol, Bayanzürkh, Chingeltei, Khan Uul, Nalaikh, Songino Khairkhan and Sükhbaatar. Each district is subdivided into khoroos, of which there are 173. Each düüreg also serves as a constituency that elects one or more representatives into the State Great Khural, the national parliament.

Demographics

Although administratively part of Ulaanbaatar, Nalaikh and Baganuur are separate cities. Bagakhangai and Baganuur are noncontiguous exclaves, the former located within the Töv Province, the latter on the border between the Töv and Khentii provinces.

References

Subdivisions of Mongolia

mn:Дүүрэг